PicoDragon is a small satellite that followed the 1U type of CubeSat program built by Vietnam National Satellite Center belong to VAST and operated in space for 3 months.

It was the first product to be built in Vietnam in the space technology field. The target for this project is to co-operate in space technology development between Vietnam and Japan. It is also the first Vietnamese satellite to launch successfully to space. Before, there had been 4 satellites launched including: VNREDSat 1A, F-1, Vinasat-1 and Vinasat-2 but F-1 which failed when launching. Vinasat-1, Vinasat-2, VNREDSat 1A were all built by foreign partners or companies.

Specifications
Size: 
 Weight: 
 Time operating: About 3 months
 Orbit
 High: 
 Inclination: 51.6 degrees
 Senses devices:
 CMOS camera (640 × 480 dpi) to take picture about Earth
 Contact by wireless link
 Broadcast station frequency about 437.250 MHz
 Telemetry downlink 1k2 bit/s AFSK 800 mW AX.25 about 437.365 MHz
 Very high frequency uplink use for control.

Journey 
2:48 AM (Vietnamese time zone) 4 August 2013, PicoDragon followed by ArduSat-1, ArduSat-X, TechEdSat-3 of United States and Kirobo robot of Japan were launched at Tanegashima by Kounotori of Japan. Before the launch into orbit to operate by ISS, it was held back to check.

19 November 2013 (Vietnamese time zone) PicoDragon was launched into orbit by the ISS. 4 hours later, some first signals were successfully received by the ground station in Japan. After that, the ground station of VNSC also received signals from PicoDragon. Before, 4 August, PicoDragon was successfully launch into ISS through the transport spacecraft HTV-4 of Japan. After more than 3 months in the orbit, PicoDragon completed the mission but burned when it entered the atmosphere.

Future

References
 HTV4 (KOUNOTORI 4) Mission Press Kit

Pico Dragon

PicoDragon completed its mission (Vietnamese)

External links
 PicoDragon - Vietnam National Satellite Center

2013 in Vietnam
Satellites of Vietnam